The 2007–08 A Group was the 60th season of the Bulgarian A Football Group since its establishment in 1948 and the 84th of a Bulgarian national top football division. The season began on 11 August 2007 and ended on 17 May 2008. CSKA Sofia won their 31st record league title. Last time they scooped the title was in 2004–05 season. CSKA won the league without a single defeat, 16 points ahead of their archrival Levski Sofia.

Despite the convincing results during the season, CSKA failed to get a UEFA license to participate in the Champions League due to unpaid debts. The guilt for the disaster in the club was taken by their chairman Aleksandar Tomov.

The league was contested by 16 teams, thirteen returning from the 2006–07 season and three promoted from the 2006–07 B Group. The defending champion was Levski Sofia. Chernomorets Burgas and Pirin Blagoevgrad gained automatic promotion as winners of East and West B PFG. Vidima-Rakovski Sevlievo gained promotion through the Promotion Play-Off beating Naftex Burgas 1–0 on 2 June 2007. The promoted teams replaced Conegliano German, Rodopa Smolyan, and Rilski Sportist Samokov, who were relegated after one, four, and one year in the A Group, respectively.

Teams

Stadia and locations 

1^. Stadiums of Botev Plovdiv and Pirin Blagoevgrad have the same names, but they are placed in different cities.

League table

Results

Champions 
CSKA Sofia

Iliev, Kabous, Amuneke and Chilikov left the club during a season.

Top scorers

References

External links 
2007–08 Statistics of A Group at a-pfg.com

First Professional Football League (Bulgaria) seasons
1
Bul